Coregonus hoyi, also known as the bloater, is a species or form of freshwater whitefish in the family Salmonidae. It is found in most of the Great Lakes and in Lake Nipigon, and inhabits underwater slopes. This fish is not to be confused with the extinct deepwater cisco (Coregonus johannae), a large fish that shared a common name with the bloater.

Description 

The bloater is a small, silvery-coloured whitefish with a pink and purple iridescence. It has a greenish tinge above, and a whitish belly. It is very similar to the kiyi, from which it may be distinguished by its lighter upper lip and smaller eye. Its body is deepest at its middle, it has small and pale fins, and it has 40–47 long gill rakers. The discoverer of the bloater, P. R. Hoy, thought it to be "the most beautiful of the white fish".

Distribution 

The bloater is native to all of the Great Lakes (except Lake Erie) and in Lake Nipigon. Across its range it is in decline, and it is listed as Vulnerable to global extinction by the IUCN Red List. It was extirpated in Lake Ontario and is extirpated in Lake Nipigon, is uncommon in Lake Michigan and is in decline Lakes Superior and Huron. This decline is caused mostly by predation by the alewife, and also by sea lamprey predation and pollution.

However, efforts to re-introduce the species in to Lake Ontario have been met with great success. Multiple North American fishery agencies have aided in the bloater's return to the lake, due to the positive impact it could have on its food web. Recent studies have shown that this fish has made a surprising comeback, and it is now re-established in Lake Ontario. State, provincial and federal agencies aim to stock 500,000 Coregonus hoyi into Lake Ontario by the year 2015.

Taxonomy and etymology 

The specific epithet of the bloater is given after Dr. P. R. Hoy of Racine, Wisconsin. Hoy did not describe the fish himself, but had ichthyologist James W. Milner name the species. Milner placed it in the genus Argyrosomus, now considered a junior synonym of Coregonus, the genus in which the bloater is now placed. The generic name Coregonus, given by Carl Linnaeus in his 1758 tenth edition of Systema Naturæ, is derived from Greek and means "angled eye", referring to the tilted pupil of whitefishes. It is closely related to the cisco or lake herring, Coregonus artedi, and the shortjaw cisco, both of which it is known to hybridise with. The common name of the bloater comes from the swollen appearance it has after being brought up from the deep waters it inhabits. The same name is given to certain type of smoked herring in Britain, which is swelled in its preparation. The bloater is one of the several taxa in the Coregonus artedi complex of freshwater whitefishes, which sometimes all are considered to belong to a single species.

Ecology and behaviour 

There it inhabits underwater slopes, and is tolerant of temperatures between 34.7 and 52.4 degrees Fahrenheit (1.5 to 11.4 Celsius). When it is brought to the surface its gas bladder expands, giving it a swollen appearance.

The bloater feeds mostly on animals living at the lake bottom (zoobenthos), but will sometimes eat small drifting animals, or zooplankton. The shrimp Mysis diluviana, and the amphipod Diporeia hoyi, also named after P. R. Hoy, are recorded as food items. The lake trout, various species of introduced salmon, and the burbot all are known to prey on the bloater. In the nineteenth century it was abundant, and was often caught by fishermen, among whom it was known as the "moon-eye". It was considered a good panfish, but too small to be marketable. Since most of the other "chubs" of the Great Lakes have become extinct, the average size of the bloater has increased, and it is caught and smoked in the United States. The bloater is ignored by sport fishermen, since it is small and found at great depths, and it has too small of a mouth to be used as bait.

Spawning occurs all year round, but is usually in the winter or autumn. The amount of eggs produced by the female varies depending upon her size, and ranges between 3,230 and 18,768. Larval bloaters head to the cool bottom of lakes before becoming pelagic, and by their first summers they become bottom-dwellers. Larval bloaters have a high mortality until they become large enough to avoid predation by other bloaters and alewives. It is slow-growing, because of the scarcity of food in its habitat.

References

Works cited

External links 
 
 
 Animal Diversity Web

hoyi
Fish of the Great Lakes
Fish described in 1874